Andrea Kéri (born 3 July 1984) is a Hungarian female hammer thrower, who won an individual gold medal at the Youth World Championships.

References

External links

1984 births
Living people
Hungarian female hammer throwers
21st-century Hungarian women